Lucy Fallon (born 13 November 1995) is an English actress. She played Bethany Platt in the ITV soap opera Coronation Street (2015–2020). The role has earned her widespread recognition and several accolades, including two British Soap Awards, an Inside Soap Award, and a National Television Award.

Early life
Fallon was born on 13 November 1995 in Blackpool, Lancashire, to engineer Andrew Fallon and accountant Angela Fallon. She has two older sisters, Rachel and Laura. She grew up in Cleveleys, Lancashire.

From the age of two, Fallon studied singing, dancing and drama at the Barbara Jackson Theatre Arts Centre; since the age of eight, she had private drama classes, and also took the London Academy of Music and Dramatic Art (LAMDA) exams. She first went to Hodgson Academy, and then attended the Blackpool Sixth Form College, where she achieved a Distinction Star and two Distinctions in BTEC Extended Diploma Performing Arts. For financial reasons, she declined offers from the Mountview Academy of Theatre Arts and ArtsEd to study musical theatre.

Before landing her role in Coronation Street, Fallon had several part-time jobs, including working at Subway, Next, New Look, and in the Merrie England bar on the Blackpool North Pier. At the same time, she appeared as a dancer in the pantomime Sleeping Beauty at the Blackpool Grand Theatre.

Career

Acting

Fallon made her professional acting debut in 2015 when she was cast as Bethany Platt, the daughter of Sarah Platt (Tina O'Brien), in the ITV soap opera Coronation Street. A returning character, Bethany had been played by child actors Mia Cookson (2000) and twins Amy and Emily Walton (2000–2007), before Fallon took over. She was 19 when she was cast to play the 14-year-old Bethany. She was offered the role after it emerged that the actress who was originally chosen for the part had lied about her age.

Fallon described Bethany as "a bit of a wild child. She's very feisty, but she does a lot of it to get a reaction." The Guardians Hannah Verdier thought that she was "perfect" for the role and that her comedic skills were a "reincarnation of Joan Rivers, only with a Mancunian accent"; however, Steven D. Wright from the same newspaper felt that she was "far too old for her part." While on the soap, Fallon's character was involved in a highly publicised grooming and sexual exploitation storyline, which earned Fallon widespread acclaim. Barbara Ellen of The Guardian found her performance "immaculate", while Daily Mirrors Ian Hyland wrote that scenes which saw Bethany survive a kidnapping to testify in court against her abuser gave Fallon "another chance to show what a fine actress she has become." Fallon won the Best Actress award at the 2017 Inside Soap Awards, the Outstanding Serial Drama Performance at the 2018 National Television Awards, and the Best Actress and Best Female Dramatic Performance at the 2018 British Soap Awards.

Fallon left Coronation Street at the end of her contract in 2020 to pursue other projects. She filmed her last scenes in January, and her final appearance aired on 4 March. She starred as George alongside Pearl Mackie in the 2021 Audible horror series Sour Hall, set and recorded on a Yorkshire farm, which tells the story of a lesbian couple tormented by a Boggart. Fallon will next appear as Molly in an upcoming ITV miniseries reimagining of Henry Fieldings novel The History of Tom Jones, a Foundling titled Tom Jones.

Other endeavours
Fallon competed in the ITV Christmas special All Star Musicals which aired on 24 December 2017 and was voted the winner for her rendition of "Don't Cry for Me Argentina" from the musical Evita. She starred in the ITV reality miniseries Don't Rock the Boat in November 2020.

Personal life
Fallon has been in a relationship with footballer Ryan Ledson since 2020. Having suffered a miscarriage in March 2022, she fell pregnant again later that year, and gave birth to their son on 30 January 2023.

Filmography

Television

Audio

Awards and nominations

References

External links

 

1995 births
Living people
21st-century English actresses
Actresses from Lancashire
English soap opera actresses
English television actresses
People from Blackpool